Angasima-tepui, also known as Adanta, Adankasima or Adankachimö, is a tepui in Bolívar state, Venezuela. A relatively isolated peak, both it and nearby Upuigma-tepui lie just south of the vast Chimantá Massif, from which they are separated by the Río Aparurén valley. Amurí-tepui, the closest member of the Chimantá Massif, is only  from Angasima-tepui.

Its summit plateau is heavily windswept, the northern part being dominated by low herbaceous vegetation. A southern peak bears dense tepui scrub. It is situated entirely within the bounds of Canaima National Park.

The undescribed pitcher plant Heliamphora sp. 'Angasima Tepui' is endemic to the summit region of Angasima-tepui.

See also
 Distribution of Heliamphora

References

Further reading

  Brewer-Carías, C. (2010). El origen de los tepuyes: los hijos de las estrellas. Río Verde 3: 54–69.
 
 Pruski, J.F. (1989). Notes on the Compositae of the Guayana Highland—I. A new species of Stomatochaeta and the reduction of Guaicaia to Glossarion (Compositae: Mutisieae). Brittonia 41(1): 35–40. 
 Vegas-Vilarrúbia, T., S. Nogué & V. Rull (August 2012). Global warming, habitat shifts and potential refugia for biodiversity conservation in the neotropical Guayana Highlands. Biological Conservation 152: 159–168. 

Tepuis of Venezuela
Mountains of Venezuela
Mountains of Bolívar (state)